John Leroy "Roy" Grindell (June 5, 1882 – April 18, 1948) was an American businessman, historian, and politician.

Born in Marion, Iowa, Grindell lived in Platteville, Wisconsin. He graduated from the University of Wisconsin in 1905. Grindell was principal of several schools in Wisconsin. In 1908, Grindell was involved with the John H. Grindell & Company, a retail marble and granite business, in Platteville, Wisconsin. Grindell was curator of the Wisconsin Historical Society and collected museum specimens and historical items. He was also the executive director of the Grant County Historical Society. In 1919, Grindell served in the Wisconsin State Assembly and was a Republican. He was instrumental in having the bathroom in the capitol building renovated. Grindell died suddenly at his home in Platteville, Wisconsin.

Notes

External links

1882 births
1948 deaths
People from Marion, Iowa
People from Platteville, Wisconsin
University of Wisconsin–Madison alumni
Businesspeople from Wisconsin
Educators from Wisconsin
20th-century American politicians
20th-century American businesspeople
Republican Party members of the Wisconsin State Assembly